Dongfang railway station is a railway station on the Hainan western ring railway and the Hainan western ring high-speed railway located in Hainan, China.

External links
 

Railway stations in Hainan